Limodorum is a genus of myco-heterotrophic orchids. All species are temperate terrestrial plants and occur across much of Europe, North-West Africa, the Mediterranean Islands, and as far east as Iran.  Plants have evolved away from photosynthesis and as a result their leaves are reduced to scales. There is still chlorophyll present but the plants are believed to be solely dependent on their fungal partner for nutrients. They spend most of their life underground as a short stem with fleshy roots, the unbranched inflorescence can appear in April to June if conditions are favourable. 

The name finds its origin in "haemodoron", first applied by Theophrastus and later adopted by Jacques Daléchamps to refer to parasitic plants most likely in Orobanche.  The name is derived from the Greek “leimo-” (meadow) and “dōron,” (gift).

Species 
A very long list of names has been proposed over the years. Most of these species, once part of Limodorum, have been transferred to other genera. There are currently three recognised species in Limodorum:

Limodorum abortivum (L.) Swartz - Central Europe, the Mediterranean region as far east as Iran and the Caucasus
Limodorum trabutianum Bartolo & Pulv. - Turkey
Limodorum rubriflorum Batt. - Spain, Portugal, Balearic Islands, Sardinia, Sicily, mainland Italy, Algeria, Morocco

See also 
 List of myco-heterotrophic genera
 List of Orchidaceae genera

References 

  (1760) Definitiones Generum Plantarum 358.
  (2006) Epidendroideae (Part One). Genera Orchidacearum 4: 506 ff. Oxford University Press.

External links 
Orchids of Britain and Europe

Neottieae
Neottieae genera
Myco-heterotrophic orchids